K.Pudur village a small village in the district of Perambalur, It is a greenish village in the district of Perambalur There, Tamil Nadu, India.

Geography 

The geographical location of K.Pudur Village.

Economy
Currently, K.Pudur Village is the top Sugarcane, Tapioca, maize and More etc..,

Temples and festivals

K.Pudur Village has some temples and places, In this temple the festival is a very most famous festival around this area, similar to the.

Mariamman temple
Vinayagar temple
Murugan temple
Sivan temple
Perumal temple
Selliamman temple
Ayyanar temple
Karuppusamy temple

Agriculture and major crops 
Rice and Sugarcane are grown as a major commercial crop. The predominant soil in the district is red sanding with scattered packers of black soil. This village consists mainly of glade soil. The soil in the district is best suited for raising dry crops. Cotton also grown in many places.

Rice (vast tracts)
Sugarcane(vast tracts)
Tapioca(vast tracts)
Corn
Cotton (vast tracts)
Groundnut/peanut
Banana/plantain
Coconut
Black Gram
Millet

Gallery of K.Pudur Village

See also
 List of villages in Perambalur district

References
K.Pudur Village's Official Website
K.Pudur Village Facebook Community
K.Pudur Village Blog Page
K.Pudur Village Google maps Link
K.Pudur Village Youtube Page

External links

Perambalur District Home Page